K. Woods was a former West Indian cricket umpire. He stood in one Test match, West Indies vs. England, in 1954.

See also
 List of Test cricket umpires
 English cricket team in West Indies in 1953–54

References

Year of birth missing (living people)
Living people
Place of birth missing (living people)
West Indian Test cricket umpires